The Monakhovo gorge is a canyon in Kazakhstan. It is so named because in the early 1920s Orthodox schemers hid in caves here from the Bolsheviks. They were huddled in a crevice in the rock where they had built a small Church. But either by someone's report, or by carelessness, they were noticed by the authorities. The monks were shot, and the cave with the Church inside was blown up. Now there is only a shallow passage at the entrance to the rock's hiding place.

Description 
The Almaty nature reserve has several ecological trails that help you get acquainted with the nature of the Zailiysky Alatau range. Perhaps the most picturesque peculiar is the Monakhovo gorge. It merges with the Right Talgar gorge at an altitude of about 1400 m. the Gorge looks like a canyon with almost vertical walls of bare rocks, slopes with overhanging fir trees, a small cave and beautiful waterfalls. The Nun river flows through the entire gorge. The water in it is the purest in winter and summer, you can and even need to drink this water. It has a healing and tonic effect. The path goes along the river, many times you have to go from Bank to Bank, passes through the gorge with rocky, steep slopes overgrown with coniferous and deciduous forest, there are Tien-Shan firs, birches, pines, aspens, hawthorn, barberry, briar, etc. Slowly moving along the gorge, a group of tourists often stops to capture the beautiful views of the gorge. The air is clear, clean, and sometimes it is mixed with the smell of mint and other mountain herbs. Strawberries and raspberries grow right along the path
On Christmas trees you can see a squirrel, a blue bird nests here. Usually the tour ends at the waterfall, which falls in two cascades in a press filled with huge blocks. At this point, the rocks converge, forming eaves, under which it is scary to stand. Hot-headed tourists go to bathe under the waterfall. However, not everyone dares to get under the freezing jets. But those who have bathed under this natural shower, experience the full range of impressions.
Monakhovo gorge is located in the mountains of the Trans-Ili Alatau, in the Maralsay gorge, on the territory of the Almaty reserve. Walking along this route at first glance will seem difficult for people with disabilities. But these are only apparent obstacles. In fact, both small children and the elderly can cope with the rise. No one ever regrets that they went on this short exotic trip. The entire route can be completed in an hour and a half. Having rested, bathed, captured themselves on a photo and video tape, vacationers go back. And although the way back goes along the same path, nevertheless, the impressions are even more, since the views are quite different if you look down from the top.
The administration of the Almaty nature reserve is responsible for the preservation and protection of the natural monument.

Legend 
Local legend says that anyone who has ever come here, must feel an extraordinary enlightenment and purification of the soul, get a powerful energy boost.

Sources of information about the monument 
 Maryashev Monuments of Semirechye archeology and their use in excursions-Almaty, 2002

References

Canyons and gorges of Kazakhstan